Guglielmini is an Italian surname. Notable people with the surname include:

 Domenico Guglielmini (1655–1710), Italian mathematician, chemist, and physician
 Giovanni Battista Guglielmini (1763–1817), Italian physicist

See also
 Guglielmi (surname)

Italian-language surnames